Crusades is a 1995 historical documentary series presented by Terry Jones. It looked at The Crusades and used elements of black comedy.  Prominent figures are depicted by actors wearing masks and costumes making to appear as living images in the style of their cultures.  Emperor Alexios I, for example, appears as a Byzantine mosaic, while European and Muslim figures are brought to life by actors appearing in the style of medieval and near eastern miniatures.  At times, production is deliberately anachronistic, such as showing the use of 1930s style newsreels by the Church to drum up mass support for the Crusades.

Episodes

1. "Pilgrims in Arms"
The first episode recounts Byzantine Emperor Alexius's appeal to Pope Urban II for military aid with which to fight Muslim Turks.  The Pope uses the request to drum up popular support for the creation of a Christian army, with the mission of liberating Jerusalem.  European knights, recently converted to Christianity, eagerly join the Crusade.  The crusader army is preceded by the People's Crusade, a mass migration incited to go to Jerusalem by Peter the Hermit.  Recounted are massacres of Jews in Worms and Cologne The People's Crusade is crushed by Turks after the catastrophic Siege of Xerigordos and the Battle of Civetot. Kilij Arslan I, the Seljuq Sultan, emboldened by the quick end of the People's Crusade, underestimates the crusader army when it appears, and suffers defeat against them.  The crusaders, having won this early battle confidently set off for Jerusalem.  The episode ends with host Terry Jones on the road, wearing the gear of a Crusader, revealing that despite the crusaders' confidence that they would soon be in Jerusalem.

2. "Jerusalem"
The second episode covers hardships encountered by crusaders as they neared the Holy City, including intense heat and starvation. Also the Siege of Antioch and Turkish retaliation.

3. "Jihad"
The third episode chronicles the response that the Arab world gave to the gains of the Crusades. Jones takes the viewer from Syria to Jordan to shed light on the Arabs counter-crusade led by Muslim leader Saladin. Additionally, experts detail the political intrigue behind Saladin's rise to power as he tried to lead Muslims in winning back Jerusalem from the Christians.

4. "Destruction"
The Crusade of Richard I of England is explored to find the seeds of his eventual failure. The fourth episode examines the massacres during the siege of Acre, the Treaty of Ramla in 1192 when Richard was forced to concede Jerusalem to Saladin, and the establishment of the Empire of Latins in Constantinople after the Crusade of Venetian statesman Enrico Dandolo.

Controversy
A number of distinguished Crusade historians appeared to give their views on events. The documentary followed the perspective established by Steven Runciman in A History of the Crusades, which casts the Crusades in a negative light. Because the historians did not support this narrative, the producers edited the taped interviews so that the historians seemed to be agreeing with Runciman. Professor Jonathan Riley-Smith accused the producers, "they made me appear to say things that I do not believe!"

References

External links

1995 British television series debuts
1995 British television series endings
1990s British documentary television series
Television series about the Crusades
Byzantine Empire in art and culture
English-language television shows
Medieval documentaries
Documentaries about historical events
Documentary television series about war
BBC television documentaries about medieval history